The 2014 Indian general election polls in Tripura for 2 Lok Sabha seats was held in two phases on 7 and 12 April 2014. As of 7 February 2014, the total voter strength of Tripura is 2,379,541.

The main political parties in Tripura are Communist Party of India (Marxist) (CPI(M)) and Indian National Congress (INC).

Opinion poll

Election schedule

Constituency wise Election schedule are given below-

Results
The results of the elections were declared on 16 May 2014.

References

Indian general elections in Tripura
Tripura)